The Glover Mausoleum, also known as the Glover Vault, is a Greek Revival mausoleum located within the Riverside Cemetery in Demopolis, Marengo County, Alabama.   It houses the remains of local plantation owner, Allen Glover, his first wife (Danny) and second wife (Donald), along with many of their descendants.

History
The Greek Revival mausoleum was built between 1841 and 1845 on a chalk bluff overlooking the Tombigbee River, southwest of Demopolis. It was built by Mary Anne Glover, second wife of  Allen Glover, on land purchased by him in 1831 and left to his minor daughter, Ann Gaines Glover. Allen Glover died in 1840 and was initially buried elsewhere. Records in the Probate Court of Marengo County show that expenditures on the vault began in January 1841.  By the time that it was finished the executors of Allen Glover's estate had spent at least $2,136.75 on construction. The bodies of Allen Glover, his first wife, and a daughter were moved to the vaults after it was completed in 1845.  A Gothic Revival cast iron fence was later added around the vault in 1858. Ann Glover allowed other family members to be buried around the mausoleum in later years, and in 1882 she began to sell lots to the public.  This led to the establishment of the site as Riverside Cemetery.  The fence has experienced considerable vandalism in more recent years and has been largely removed.    The mausoleum was placed on the National Register of Historic Places in 1974.

Description

The mausoleum contains burial vaults for thirty people. There are fifteen vaults on the east and west sides, stacked five horizontally and three vertically.  It is a square brick structure, plastered over with smooth stucco and scored to give the appearance of ashlar. A porch surrounds the vaults on all four sides, with solid masonry corners and openings on each side supported by a span of three cast iron columns.  The low-pitched masonry roof is topped by a granite orb and cross.

See also
Rosemount (Forkland, Alabama), the only surviving Glover home in the area, also listed on the NRHP

References

National Register of Historic Places in Marengo County, Alabama
Buildings and structures in Demopolis, Alabama
Greek Revival architecture in Alabama
Buildings and structures completed in 1845
Mausoleums on the National Register of Historic Places
Monuments and memorials on the National Register of Historic Places in Alabama
1845 establishments in Alabama
Death in Alabama